Thomas McMillan (March 18, 1864 – June 7, 1932) was a Canadian politician and farmer.

McMillan ran and was narrowly defeated as a Laurier Liberal candidate in the 1917 federal election, losing by less than 600 votes. In 1919, he ran for the leadership of the Ontario Liberal Party, but received only eight votes in the leadership convention.

He ran as a Liberal candidate in the 1921 federal election, but lost by 44 votes. He was elected the Member of Parliament for Huron South in the 1925 election, and re-elected in the 1926 and 1930 elections.

He died in office in 1932.

References
 

1864 births
1932 deaths
Members of the House of Commons of Canada from Ontario
Liberal Party of Canada MPs